Novosevastopolskoye is a rural locality (a selo) in Beloselskoye Rural Settlement of Krasnogvardeysky District, Adygea, Russia. The population was 834 as of 2018. There are 15 streets.

Geography 
Novosevastopolskoye is located 18 km southeast of Krasnogvardeyskoye (the district's administrative centre) by road. Bogursukov is the nearest rural locality.

References 

Rural localities in Krasnogvardeysky District